Theodore Roosevelt "Chappie" Gray (1900 – June 4, 1972) was an American Negro league second baseman in the 1920s.

Gray played for the Kansas City Monarchs in 1920. He died in 1972 at age 71 or 72.

References

External links
Baseball statistics and player information from Baseball-Reference Black Baseball Stats and Seamheads

1900 births
1972 deaths
Date of birth missing
Place of birth missing
Place of death missing
Kansas City Monarchs players
Baseball second basemen
20th-century African-American sportspeople